Bonkers is a platform video game developed and published by Capcom. It was released in October 1994, for the Super Nintendo Entertainment System (SNES). It is based on the animated television series Bonkers.

Gameplay
Bonkers is a side-scrolling platform game. As police officer Bonkers D. Bobcat, the player must apprehend a thief who has stolen three items from a cartoon museum: the Sorcerer's Hat, the Mermaid's Voice, and the Magic Lamp. The player has several abilities, including a speed dash, which is used to break through obstacles. To stop enemies, the player can toss bombs at them, jump on their heads, or perform a speed dash. The game has six levels set across Hollywood, including a mansion, downtown, an ocean liner, a sewer, and a movie studio with Old West and science-fiction sets. Boss enemies must be battled at the end of each level.

There are various objects throughout the game, such as balloons and shields. The player can acquire items by popping balloons open, and can carry more bombs for every 10 shields collected. Donuts and cakes restore the player's health meter, and hearts can be collected to expand the meter.

Reception

Bonkers received praise for its graphics. GamePro called the game "a great first challenge for novice players". Electronic Gaming Monthly praised the sound, but considered the gameplay too easy.

Paul Dame of Windsor Star wrote that Bonkers would be at the top of his "list of games that really suck" if not for the fact that it "was made as a kids' game". He went on to write that the game's primary problem "is it is way too slow. When you get hit, it takes three to four seconds for him to recover. It may not seem like a lot but, when you're trying to play, it seems like a really longtime". Joe Blenkle of Orangevale News considered it "one of the most enjoyable" games from Capcom "in quite some time", calling it equally fun for adults and children.

In 2018, Hardcore Gaming 101 called it "a game that came and went without making much of an impact on anything", writing further, "It existed, and it was a decent use of the license, but there's so many other, better games of its type".

References

External links
 Bonkers at MobyGames

1994 video games
Bonkers (TV series)
Disney games by Capcom
Side-scrolling platform games
Single-player video games
Super Nintendo Entertainment System-only games
Video games about cats
Video games about police officers
Video games based on animated television series
Video games developed in Japan